Frances Knoche Marlatt (March 24, 1901 – November 28, 1969) was an American lawyer and politician from New York.

Life
She was born on March 24, 1901, in Buffalo, New York, the daughter of painter Hamilton Irving Marlatt (1860–1929) and Lillie Belle (Knoche) Marlatt. She attended the public schools in Mount Vernon. She graduated B.A. from Barnard College in 1921; M.A. in sociology from Columbia University in 1922; and LL.B. from New York University School of Law in 1925. She was Editor-in-Chief of the New York University Law Review, the first woman to hold that position. She was admitted to the bar in 1926, and practiced law in Mount Vernon.

In 1949, she was appointed to the Board of Supervisors of Westchester County, to fill the vacancy caused by the resignation of Charles L. Hughes.

Frances Marlatt was a member of the New York State Assembly (Westchester Co., 3rd D.) from 1954 to 1960, sitting in the 169th, 170th, 171st and 172nd New York State Legislatures.

She died on November 28, 1969, in Mount Vernon Hospital in Mount Vernon, New York; and was buried at the Woodlawn Cemetery in the Bronx.

Sources

1901 births
1969 deaths
Republican Party members of the New York State Assembly
Politicians from Mount Vernon, New York
Politicians from Buffalo, New York
Women state legislators in New York (state)
County legislators in New York (state)
Barnard College alumni
Burials at Woodlawn Cemetery (Bronx, New York)
New York University School of Law alumni
20th-century American politicians
20th-century American women politicians
Lawyers from Buffalo, New York
20th-century American lawyers